Sokratis Psaropoulos (Greek: Σωκράτης Ψαρόπουλος; born May 6, 1992) is a Greek professional basketball player, playing for Triton BC. He is 1.91 m (6 ft 3 in) tall. He plays at the shooting guard position.

Professional career
Psaropoulos began his professional career in the Greek Second Division with Peristeri, during the 2008–09 season. The team moved up to the Greek First Division, where he would play with them for three more seasons.

He would move back to the Greek Second Division, to play with Filathlitikos, for the 2012–13 season. During that season, Psaropoulos among with Antetokounmpo brothers, Giannis and Thanasis, as well as players like Nikos Gkikas, Michalis Kamperidis, and Christos Saloustros managed to take the 3rd place in the Greek 2nd Division.

On 2013, he joined Pagrati where he stayed until 2015, when he returned to Peristeri after 3 years.

National team career
Psaropoulos played at the 2010 FIBA Europe Under-18 Championship and the 2011 FIBA Europe Under-20 Championship, with the junior national teams of Greece.

References

External links
FIBA Europe Profile
Eurobasket.com Profile
Greek Basket League Profile 
Draftexpress.com Profile

1992 births
Living people
ASK Karditsas B.C. players
EFAO Zografou B.C. players
Greek Basket League players
Greek men's basketball players
Pagrati B.C. players
Peristeri B.C. players
Point guards
Shooting guards
Basketball players from Athens